Under a Rock with Tig Notaro is an American talk show produced by Funny or Die. Host Tig Notaro attempts to guess the identity of a celebrity guest on each episode. The show is sponsored by Amazon Alexa, and Alexa provides assistance as Notaro guesses. The first season consisted of six episodes and premiered online on June 4, 2019. The second season was released on November 5, 2019.

Synopsis 
Comedian Tig Notaro struggles to guess the identity of a celebrity guest, made difficult by the little pop culture she consumes and her inability to recognize celebrity faces. The guest offers her clues and Amazon Alexa assists Notaro.

Production

Development 
Notaro developed the idea for the show due to her penchant for failing to recognize very famous people such as Anne Hathaway and Al Pacino.

The show is produced by Funny or Die and Something Fierce, the production company owned by Notaro and her wife Stephanie Allynne. The series is shot in front of a studio audience. The producers invite celebrity guests with whom Notaro is unfamiliar.

Series one was directed by Amy Landecker and season two was directed by Riki Lindhome. Thomas Ouellette is the head writer. Amazon Alexa sponsors the series.

Release 
Under a Rock premiered on June 4, 2019 on FunnyorDie.com. Episodes in the first season were released every Tuesday for six weeks. Season two debuted on November 5, 2019 and ran for six more episodes.

Episodes

Season 1

Season 2

Reception

Critical response 
Under a Rock received mostly positive critical reception. In a review for Paste, John-Michael Bond wrote, "Her sweet-natured lack of knowledge creates a space of equal power, free of the star-struck ass kissing of James Corden or Jimmy Fallon’s nonstop nostalgia parade. Most importantly, it’s not cruel or based on anything negative." Writing for Slashfilm, Ethan Anderton stated, "The weird part of this program is that Amazon and their Alexa assistant are clearly sponsoring the show, because they help out with musical cues, hints, information, and more. It’s a little forced, but Tig Notaro’s dry charm makes it all coalesce together into something awkwardly hilarious."

Accolades
The series was nominated for a 2020 Producers Guild of America Award in the Outstanding Short-Form Program category.

References

External links 
 Official website
 Under a Rock with Tig Notaro on IMDb

2010s American television talk shows
2019 web series debuts
Funny or Die
American comedy web series
Tig Notaro